Ouibox was a website headquartered in Lexington, Kentucky. It features a social network aggregator, a writing tool called OuiWrite which auto-cites sources, and an affiliate shopping tool called OuiShop which generates donations to charities without affecting a user's purchase price.

Ouibox signed up 8000 users on the week it launched.

It was one of the first investments of the Bluegrass Angels Venture Fund II.

History
Ouibox was founded in 2006 by Peyton Fouts, a graduate of the English and Communications programs at the University of Kentucky.

Archived records indicate that its website showed no changes on its homepage between June 2014 and July 2019. The site had disappeared completely by August 2019.

References

External links
 Ouibox
 Ouibox pressroom`

Companies based in Lexington, Kentucky
Privately held companies based in Kentucky
Internet properties established in 2006
Aggregation websites
American social networking websites
Internet properties disestablished in 2019
2006 establishments in Kentucky
2019 disestablishments in Kentucky